Events from the year 1931 in Croatia.

Incumbents

Events

Arts and literature

Sport

Births
April 4 – Nada Iveljić, children's writer (died 2009)
May 11 – Zlatko Crnković, translator (died 2013)
July 11 – Anđelko Klobučar, composer
June 4 – Antun Vrdoljak, actor and film director
June 14 – Vasko Lipovac, painter (died 2006)
September 26 – Ivo Šlaus, physicist
November 22 – Anton Tus, soldier
December 11 – Sunčana Škrinjarić, children's writer (died 2004)

Deaths
February 11 – Bela Čikoš Sesija, painter (born 1864)
February 18 – Milan Šufflay, historian and politician (born 1879)
December 29 – Oton Kučera, astronomer (born 1857)

References

 
Years of the 20th century in Croatia
Croatia